Mehmet Sakıp Özberk (born 1 May 1945, in Gaziantep), is a Turkish former footballer and manager. He was technical director of Gaziantepspor.

References

Turkish football managers
Living people
1945 births
Siirtspor managers
Gaziantepspor managers
Adana Demirspor managers
Zeytinburnuspor managers
Altay S.K. managers
Bursaspor managers
Denizlispor managers
Samsunspor managers
Diyarbakırspor managers
Konyaspor managers
MKE Ankaragücü managers
Çaykur Rizespor managers